Khosrowabad (also Romanized as Khosrowābād) is a village in the Dehsard Rural District, in the Central District of Arzuiyeh County, Kerman Province, Iran. As of the 2006 census, its population was 293, with 63 families.

References 

Populated places in Arzuiyeh County